Deepan Sivaraman is an Indian theatre director, scenographer and academic. He is the founder of Oxygen Theatre Company based in Delhi. He is from Thrissur, Kerala. 
Sivaraman received Charles Wallace India Trust Award in 2003, Kerala Sangeetha Nataka Akademi Award and Mahindra Excellence in Theatre Awards in 2011 and 2010, respectively. Deepan served as the Artistic Director for the International Theatre Festival of Kerala(ITFOK) for 2014 edition which had a curatorial focus on transition, gender and spectatorship. Deepan Sivaraman currently is an Associate Professor of Performance Studies at School of Culture and Creative Expressions at the Ambedkar University in Delhi.

The Legend of Khasak Khasakkinte Itihasam – The Play a Milestone
Deepan involved with KM Kunjambu Smaraka Kalasamaithi.(KMK) Trikaripur for the project of The Legends of Khasak Khasakkinte Itihasam with the local village actors, it was a unique theatre project that has no similarities in the recent Indian theatre history in the terms of its production of working with village actors and the way in which the entire village got part of it. The trans – chronic post-modern novel of O. V. Vijayan, The Legends of Khasak Khasakkinte Itihasam is revived onto the stage, in the Land of dark native myths and tantalizing legends – Kasaragod. The geographical memory of Khasak is transplanted to the landscape of Kasaragod. The tree of life, Revered Time, Slits of spreading self and sins and mythicized nature of Khasak takes a re-birth to burn down into the body ofspectator. The performance fuses native religious rituals and native art forms in separately. The three months of theatre camp for the regional artists were a refreshing wind to the cultural present of Kerala, which proved that the rural art gatherings were not extinct in the cultural space. From the last remaining sapling spread a green hope which rushed the village into a spring of artistic thought. There were muted tunes, silenced slogans and an unbroken harmony which united the whole village onto the theatre. Portraying, or interpreting Khasak into its multidimensional plurality was a challenge to any medium, to which this theatrical interpretation stands as an exemption. The characters of Khasak Allapicha Mollakka, Maimuna, Appukili, Naizam Ali, Kuttandan Pushari and Ravi meet the spectators in the aesthetically subverted, politically deconstructed, surreal space.

Directorial works along with its design

Scenography works

Major Theatre Festivals participated

 2019 – International Theatre Festival of Kerala Kerala, Dark Things
 2018 – Wuzhen International Theatre Festival Shanghai, The Cabinet of Dr Caligari
 2018 – YULICA International theatre festival Krakow, Nationalism Project.
 2017 – International Theatre Festival of Kerala 9th Edition, The Cabinet of Dr Caligari
 2016 – International Theatre Festival of Kerala 8th Edition, The Legends of Khasak
 2016 – Bharat Rang Mahotsav Delhi, The Cabinet of Dr Caligari
 2013 – International Theatre Festival of Kerala 7th Edition, Virasat
 2012 – International Theatre Festival National School of Drama Delhi, Peer Gynt
 2011 – International Theatre Festival of Kerala 5th Edition, Peer Gynt
 2011 – National theatre Festival of Kerala, Peer Gynt
 2010 – Ibsen Festival New Delhi, Peer Gynt
 2010 – Mahindra Excellence in theatre Awards New Delhi, Spinal Cord
 2010 – Rangayana National Theatre Festival Bangalore, Spinal Cord
 2009 – International Theatre Festival National School of Drama Delhi, Spinal Cord
 2009 – International Theatre Festival of Kerala, Spinal Cord
 2009 – National Theatre Festival Thiruvananthapuram Kerala, Spinal Cord
 2007 – Avignon Theatre Festival France, Siddhartha
 2006 – Prithvi Theatre Festival Mumbai, Bagavdajjukam
 2006 – South Asian Theatre Festival New Delhi, Siddhartha
 2004 – International Theatre Festival National School of Drama New Delhi, Siddhartha
 2003 – International Theatre Festival National School of Drama Delhi, Bagavadajjukam
 2001 – International Theatre Festival National School of Drama New Delhi, Verdigris
 2000 – Festival De Alameda Lisbon Portugal, Verdigris
 2000 – Asian Woman Theatre Festival New Delhi, Thathri Realising Self

Awards 
2010 – Mahindra Excellence in Theatre Awards
2012 – Kerala Sangeetha Nataka Akademi Award

References 

Indian theatre directors
Living people
Theatre practitioners
Indian drama teachers
Year of birth missing (living people)
Pondicherry University alumni
Recipients of the Kerala Sangeetha Nataka Akademi Award